UV-induced apoptosis 
UV-induced apoptosis is an adequate (physiological) reaction of a cell damaged by UV radiation (UVR) in a sufficiently large (lethal) dose and it prevents the disordered destruction of UV damaged cells by help necrosis. Cell elimination by apoptosis occurs when UV-induced cell damage which cannot be repaired by the intracellular repair system exceeds at it certain limit (lethal damage). Through apoptosis, the cells are self-disassembled into compartments with their subsequent utilization (mainly by neighboring cells). The first time sign of the beginning of the apoptosis system is working in a UV damaged cell is the activation of  restriction enzymes,  which divide cell DNA into fragments convenient for utilization. But too large a dose of UVR can lead to breakdown (inactivation) of the energy-dependent mechanism of apoptosis (super lethal damage). In this case, cell destruction occurs randomly, not orderly, and during a significantly longer (compared with apoptosis) time interval. UV-irradiated cells do not change their appearance for a long time [1, 6], as a result of which the researchers may make the erroneous conclusion that “revealed an unexpected response to a dose at which a higher dose of UV increased the viability of keratinocytes”  [2]. The fact that UV-induced apoptosis at high doses of UVR begins to be replaced by necrosis was established in 2000 [3]. For keratinocytes, the proportion of cells that have elimination by help apoptosis, with an increase in UVR dose can reach to achieve 45%, but with a further increase in the dose of UVR (due to the shutdown of the mechanism of apoptosis), destruction of damaged cells by help  necrosis and the part of cells that eliminated by apoptosis begins to decrease (non-monotonous dose dependence of UV-induced apoptosis) [4, 11]. In the dose range of UVR from “lethal” to “super-lethal”, “pro-inflammatory” apoptosis can be manifested, which was experimentally discovered in 2003 [5]. This may be the result of partial damage to the apoptosis mechanism by UV radiation [1]. If at moderate doses “pure” apoptosis does not cause an inflammatory reaction, then at sufficiently large (but lower than superlethal) doses, an inflammatory reaction arises due to pro-inflammatory apoptosis, which leads to the appearance of “fast” erythema for UV irradiated skin keratinocytes. Kinetic  of “fast” erythema is much faster by the time of development of UV erythema caused by necrosis of UV damaged keratinocytes [6]. The most erythemogenic is UVB (UVB, 280 - 320 nanometers) the spectral range of UVR, since radiation in this range is less absorbed by the outer layers of the skin, which allows UVB radiation, in contrast to UVC (UVC, 200 - 280 nm), to reach more deep layers skin and act on keratinocytes of the deep-lying basal layer of the epidermis of the skin. The ability to induce apoptosis for UVB and UVC radiation is due to the fact that the DNA of the nucleus [7] and / or mitochondria [8] of the cell absorbs UVR well in the UVC and UVB spectral range. Keratinocytes of the skin (regardless of UVR exposure) are in a state of programmed apoptosis, during which the keratinocytes of the basal layer are removed from it and during the transition through all layers of the epidermis within 28 days turn into flakes of the outer stratum corneum, which are subsequently desquamated. It is clear that the keratinocyte response to UV exposure will depend on what phase of programmed apoptosis (at what distance from the basal layer) the keratinocyte experienced UV exposure, and this is the main reason for the difference of the UV effect for UVC and UVB on the skin. There are also differences in the initiation of mitochondrial (internal) and caspase-dependent (external) apoptosis for the UVC and UVB spectral ranges [9]. Sunburn cells (SBS) are the keratinocytes in the process of UV-induced apoptosis (both “pure” and pro-inflammatory). The appearance of SBC may be not  associated with an inflammatory reaction, but the role of UV-induced apoptosis of skin keratinocytes in the development of UV erythema (hyperemia, redness) of the skin has been established, which allowed the development of a patent-protected METHOD FOR QUANTITATIVE ASSESSMENT OF APOPTOSIS SYSTEM [10], in which “the brightest lamp of skin display "(photoerythema) is used (as an indicator of the manifestation of strictly dosed sterile inflammation) to diagnose the state of the body systems involved in the elimination of UV-induced damage.  Such systems (except apoptosis) include the immune system, the intracellular repair system, the microcirculation system and not only.

References

1.	Бондырев Ю.А. УФ-индуцированная эритема кожи как тестирующее диагностическое воздействие.  Бюллетень ВСНЦ СО РАМН  № 5 (19), с.196-203  Иркутск 2001

2.	Chi-Shuo Chen e.a.Unexpected dose response of HaCaT to UVB irradiation In Vitro Cellular & Developmental Biology - Animal • August 2018

3.	Mammone T; Gan D; Collins D; Lockshin RA; Marenus K; Maes D Successful separation of apoptosis and necrosis pathways in HaCaT keratinocyte cells induced by UVB irradiation. Cell Biol Toxicol 2000;16(5):293-302 (ISSN: 0742-2091) 	Estee Lauder, Melville, New York 11747, USA

4.	Бондырев Ю.А. Особенности дозовой зависимости индукции апоптоза клетки на примере УФ индуцированного апоптоза кератиноцитов // Успехи современного естествознания. – 2004. – № 10. – С. 27-27;

5.	Caricchio R, McPhie L, Cohen PL. J Immunol. 2003 Dec 1;171(11):5778-86. Ultraviolet B radiation-induced cell death: critical role of ultraviolet dose in inflammation and lupus autoantigen redistributionaricchio R 2003

6.	Бондырев Ю.А., Корытов Л.И. Анализ кинетики эритемы кожи, вызванной УФ - излучением. Рос. Физиол. журн. им. И. М. Сеченова. Т. 90. № 8. С.427. 2004 г.

7.	Urbach F. The ultraviolet action spectrum for erythema—history. In: Mat-thes R, Sliney D, eds. Measurements of optical radiation hazards. Munich: International Commission on Non-Ionizing Radiation Protection; 1998: 51–62.

8.	Бондырев Ю.А. Роль повреждений мембраны и ядра клетки и митохондрий в развитии эритемы кожи, индуцированной ультрафиолетовым излучением. Фундаментальные Исследования, №6 2004г.с. 93.

9.	Takasawa R, Nakamura H, Mori T, Tanuma S. Differential apoptotic pathways in human keratinocyte HaCaT cells exposed to UVB and UVC. Genome & Drug Research Center, Tokyo University of Science, 2641 Yamazaki, Noda, Chiba 278-8510, Japan. 2005 Oct;10(5):1121-30. PMID: 1615164

10.	Бондырев Ю.А. СПОСОБ КОЛИЧЕСТВЕННОЙ ОЦЕНКИ АКТИВНОСТИ СИСТЕМЫ АПОПТОЗА // Патент России № 2653389. 2018. Бюл. № 13.

11. Bondyrev Y. Establishing mechanism of development skin erythema induced by ultraviolet radiation in interests of dynamic UV erythemal diagnostic.     Österreichisches Multiscience Journal (Innsbruck, Austria) VOL 1, No22 (2019) p. 12 - 23

UVB-induced apoptosis is the programmed cell death of cells that become damaged by ultraviolet rays. This is notable in skin cells, to prevent melanoma. Some studies have shown that exercise accelerates this process.

Apoptosis is a physiological process, that promotes the active suicide of cells, resulting in an advantage, unlike necrosis which occurs from trauma.  In the average human adult it is estimated that 50 to 70 billion cells die each day from apoptosis.  One of the largest promoters of apoptosis is exposure to ultraviolet (UV) light.  While UV light is essential to human life it can also cause harm by inducing cancer, immunosuppression, photoaging, inflammation, and cell death.

Of the various components of sunlight, ultraviolet radiation B (UVB) (290-320 nm) is considered to be the most harmful.  This type of radiation acts primarily on the epidermis, and in particular the keratinocytes.   Keratinocytes are known to form a barrier to provide a layer of protection within the skin against environmental hazards.  Within the epidermis, in addition to the keratinocytes, there are melanocytes (melanin producing cells).  These cells produce pigment that provides the keratinocytes with protection against UVB radiation.  Once the keratinocytes have been damaged irreparably as a result of UVB radiation, they are marked for destruction by apoptosis to eliminate them as they are potentially mutagenic cells.  Failure of the body to remove DNA damaged cells increases the risk of skin cancer.

One consequence of acute UVB exposure is the occurrence of sunburn cells, keratinocytes, within the epidermis.  It has been found that when exposed to UVB radiation the DNA in an epidermis cell undergoes fragmentation, which could result in the growth of tumor cells.  To prevent this the cell undergoes a morphological change into keratinocytes.  These keratinocytes exhibit the capacity to release TNF-α (tumor necrosis factor - alpha) that stop the growth of the tumor by promoting the death of the cell.

If keratinocyte cells have been damaged by UVB radiation, the term "sunburn cell" or "SBC formation" is used.  It is thought that when keratinocytes have been damaged by UVB radiation, this triggers a series of processes, caused in part by damage to the DNA.  A study indicates that it may be at the mitochondria where the various processes (ligan-dependent receptor activation and cytosolic signaling) pathways are activated by the production of reactive oxygen species (ROS) that may direct the destruction of keratinocytes through apoptosis by activating caspase.  As a result of increased exposure to an oxygen-reduced environment, this promotes the development of ROS thereby linking the incidence of ROS with keratinocytes and making these cells more sensitive to UVB radiation.   A study by Tobi et al., in 2002 has linked ROS with cytotoxicity, apoptosis, mutations, and carcinogenesis.  Mild hypoxia (1-5%) sensitized keratinocytes to UVB-induced apoptosis, while protecting melanocytes from environmental stresses.

A study by Mark Schotanus, et al., has demonstrated that in addition to potential damage to keratinocytes and melanocytes, exposure to UVB radiation may also produce a loss of potassium ions, which may then cause the activation of apoptotic pathways in lymphocytes and neuronal cells as opposed to keratinocytes and melanocytes.  It has been demonstrated that incubation of lymphocytes and neuronal cells in elevated concentrations of potassium ions provides protection from apoptosis.   This phenomenon was demonstrated in tears, which have higher levels of potassium ions, and bathe cells of the eye and therefore provides protection from UVB radiation. Reduction of potassium ions promotes apoptosis and the synthesis of initiator caspase-8 and the effector caspase-3.

A study reported in the International Journal of Molecular Sciences in 2012; 13(3), pages 2560-2675, published February 28, 2012 by Terrerence J. Piva, Catherine M. Davern, Paula M. Hall, Clay M. Winterford and Kay A.O. Ellem, that while caspase may play a role in apoptosis, it is specifically not as a result of caspase-3.  It was reported in that study that the process of apoptosis includes: "detachment from the substrate, followed by loss of specialized membrane structures such as microvilli.  The cell then undergoes rounding, shrinkage and blabbing before condensation of chromatin is observed in the nucleus.  After a period of time the cell fragments into apoptotic bodies, which in vivo are engulfed and degraded by phagocytic cells such as macrophages"    Caspase I is involved in the aforementioned cell membrane activity but not caspase-3.

UVB-induced apoptosis pathway
The sequence of events that leads to apoptosis is multifaceted and complex.  Despite the simple concept of apoptosis, the sequence of events that leads to it and other conditions that attempt to counter act it can be very cumbersome.  Since apoptosis is a last resort alternative, it takes the initiation of multiple other genes (ING2, p53, or Ras subfamily) expressed before the cell is finally programmed for death.  In addition, genes like Survivin can attempt to suppress apoptosis.

References

Free Radical Biology and Medicine, Vol 52, Issue 6, 15 March 2012, Pages 1111-1120. Skin mild hypoxia enhances killing of UVB-damaged keratinocytes through relative oxygen species-mediated apoptosis requiring Nova and Bim.  Kris Kys, Hannaelore Maes, Graieia Andrei, Rober Snoeck, Maria Garmyn, Partiizia Agostinis
Experimental Eye Research, Vol 93, Issue 5, November 2011, pages 735-740. Stratified Corneal timbal epithelial cells are protected from UVB-induced apoptosis by elevated extracellular potassium ions. Mark Schotanus, Leah R. Koetje, Rachel E. Van Dyken, John L. Ubels
Methods 2008; 44; pages 205-221, Apoptosis and necrosis, detection, discrimination and phagocytosis, Krysko D.V. Berghe T.V. D. Herde, K., Vandenabeele P

External links
LiveScience article on the subject

Cell signaling
Immune system
Programmed cell death